Gregory Edward Feek (born 20 July 1975) is a New Zealand rugby union former player who now works as a rugby coach. He played 10 tests for the All Blacks between 1999 and 2001 as a prop, in addition to 63 appearances with the Crusaders.

Feek was born in New Plymouth. He played provincial rugby for Taranaki between 1996 and 1998 and Canterbury between 1999 and 2005. He also played for New Zealand Maori in 2006. He since retired from playing rugby. 

In 2008, Feek was the forwards coach for the Wellington Hurricanes in Super Rugby.
Feek joined Leinster as scrum coach for the 2010/2011 season. He also worked as Ireland scrum coach, a position he left after the 2019 World Cup.

References

External links

1975 births
New Zealand international rugby union players
Canterbury rugby union players
Crusaders (rugby union) players
People educated at New Plymouth Boys' High School
Living people
New Zealand rugby union players
Rugby union players from New Plymouth
Rugby union props
Tasman rugby union players
Māori All Blacks players
Taranaki rugby union players